Bocchoris inspersalis, the dotted sable, is a moth of the family Crambidae. It can be found in subtropical Africa South of the Sahara, many islands of the Indian Ocean, South and East Asia, from India to Japan.

Foodplants
The larvae feed on Malvaceae (Triplochiton scleroxylon).

References

External links
Flickr.com - pictures of Bocchoris inspersalis
Boldsystems.org - pictures of Bocchoris inspersalis

Moths described in 1852
Spilomelinae
Moths of the Arabian Peninsula
Moths of Japan
Moths of Sub-Saharan Africa